John Anderson Harkins (10 April 1881 – 22 April 1916) was a Scottish professional footballer who played in the Football League for Leeds City and Middlesbrough.

Personal life 
Harkins enlisted in the Black Watch in June 1898 and was bought out of the army by Middlesbrough in September 1906. Soon after Britain's entry into the First World War in August 1914, Harkins re-enlisted in the Black Watch. He was serving as an acting corporal when he was killed in action near Amarah, Iraq on 22 April 1916. He was buried in Amara War Cemetery.

Career statistics

References 

Scottish footballers
1916 deaths
British Army personnel of World War I
British military personnel killed in World War I
1881 births
Middlesbrough F.C. players
Footballers from Glasgow
Black Watch soldiers
Scottish Football League players
English Football League players
Southern Football League players
Broxburn Athletic F.C. players
Bathgate F.C. players
Leeds City F.C. players
Darlington F.C. players
Coventry City F.C. players
Association football wing halves
Burials at Amara War Cemetery